Charles Keith may refer to:
 Charles H. Keith, American music publisher
 Charles A. Keith, American football, basketball and baseball coach

See also
 Charles & Keith, a Singaporean footwear and accessories retailer
 Keith Charles (disambiguation)